The 1914 Oxford University by-election was held on 30 June 1914.  The by-election was held due to the death of the incumbent Conservative MP, Sir William Anson.  It was won by the Conservative candidate Rowland Prothero, who was elected unopposed.

References

1914 elections in the United Kingdom
1914 in England
20th century in Oxford
By-elections to the Parliament of the United Kingdom in Oxford University
Unopposed by-elections to the Parliament of the United Kingdom (need citation)
Elections in Oxford
June 1914 events